Tsar Nicholas may refer to:

 Nicholas I of Russia (1796–1855), Emperor of Russia from 1825 to 1855
 Nicholas II of Russia (1868–1918), last Emperor of Russia from 1894 until abdication in 1917. Also known as Orthodox Saint Nicholas the Passion Bearer